Patrick Campbell (1977–1999) was a volunteer in the Irish National Liberation Army (INLA) died on 10 October 1999 after being wounded during a conflict in Dublin, Republic of Ireland between the INLA and drug dealers.

Campbell was born in New Barnsley, West Belfast, Northern Ireland and moved to Dublin to work in the building industry. At some point, he joined the INLA, an Irish republican paramilitary group.

In the summer of 1999, the INLA became involved in a violent dispute with criminals in West Dublin. The INLA claims that it was trying to halt the sale of illegal drugs in the local working class community.

On 6 October 1999, Campbell and two other INLA men captured the drug gang members in a warehouse in Ballymount Industrial Estate in Walkinstown. The INLA men were bundling the captured men into a van when other drug gang members arrived at the scene. During the scuffle that ensued, Campbell was stabbed in the leg with a samurai sword, severing an artery and causing a huge loss of blood, ultimately causing his death. He was buried with full military honours in Milltown Cemetery in Belfast by the INLA who staged a show of force including a uniformed colour party. Over 1,000 people attended his funeral. Campbell's funeral was one of the last high-profile republican paramilitary funerals in Ireland to date. A man was charged with Campbell's murder but the charges were later dropped. Several more shootings have since been attributed to the feud.

Sources
Ireland's Own
Monitor of conflict related deaths in Ireland
Another page from BIRW
Irish Examiner
IRSM Page about Campbell

References

1977 births
1999 deaths
Irish National Liberation Army members
Irish republicans
People murdered by Irish organized crime
Deaths by stabbing in Ireland